Seldom Seen may refer to:

Places
 Seldom Seen, a prior name for the unincorporated community, Stony Bottom, West Virginia
 Seldom Seen, a locality in Wulgulmerang East in the Shire of East Gippsland, in the north-east of Victoria, Australia
 Seldom Seen, a locality in Glencoyne in Cumbria, England

Music
 "Seldom Seen", a track on the 2000 album Mo Thugs III: The Mothership by Mo Thugs Family
 "Seldom Seen Sam", a track on the 1974 album. M'Lady by Colleen Hewett
 "Seldom Seen Sam", a track on the 1995 album Forgotten Roads: The Best of If by If
 The Seldom Seen Kid, a 2008 album by English rock band Elbow
 Seldom Seen Often Heard, a 2006 album by producer Ghost (producer)
 Seven Songs Seldom Seen, a VHS release by the band Toad the Wet Sprocket c. 1992

Buildings and properties
 Seldom Seen, family property in the autobiography, The Land Remembers, of Ben Logan
 Seldom Seen Farm, a farm in Leicestershire
 Seldom Seen Arch, an archway over Saw Mill Run in  Beechview, Pittsburgh, Pennsylvania

Literature
 Seldom Seen Smith, a character in the novels The Monkey Wrench Gang and Hayduke Lives! by Edward Abbey
 Seldom Seen in August, a long fiction work by Kealan Patrick Burke
 Seldom Seen Road, a book of poetry by Jen Butler nominated for the Raymond Souster Award

Horses
 Seldom Seen, a connemara/thoroughbred cross that competed at the highest levels of dressage
 Seldom Seen Sue, a thoroughbred, the 1987 winner of the Adoration Stakes

Film
 Seldom Seen, a gangster in the film Kansas City (film) played by Harry Belafonte
 Hezzikia "Seldom Seen" Jackson, a character in the film Penitentiary (1979 film) played by Floyd Chatman

See also
 The Seldom Scene, an American bluegrass band